Le Chambon-Feugerolles is a commune in the French department of Loire, central France.

Population

Twin towns
Le Chambon-Feugerolles is twinned with Herzebrock-Clarholz, Germany, since 1973.

See also
Communes of the Loire department

References

Communes of Loire (department)